This is an overview of Russian early-warning radars for air surveillance, and related design bureaus.

NNIIRT 

The Nizhny Novgorod Research Institute of Radio Engineering (Russian acronym: NNIIRT) has since 1948 developed a number of radars. These were mainly radars in the VHF-band, and many of which featured developments in technology that represented "first offs" in the Soviet Union. Innovations include the first Soviet air surveillance radar with a circular scan: the P-8 Volga (NATO: KNIFE REST A) in 1950, the first 3D radar: the 5N69 Salute (NATO: BIG BACK) in 1975, and in 1982 the first VHF-band 3D-radar: the 55Zh6 Nebo (NATO: TALL RACK). Other innovations were radars with frequency hopping; the P-10 Volga A (NATO: KNIFE REST B) in 1953, radars with transmitter signal coherency and special features like moving target indicator (MTI); the P-12 Yenisei (NATO: SPOON REST) in 1955 as well as the P-70 Lena-M with chirp signal modulation in 1968 or the widely used P-18 Terek (NATO: SPOON REST D) in 1970.

NIIDAR 

The Dalney Radiosvyazi NII company (Russian acronym: NIIDAR) developed a number of radars from 1949 to 1959 in co-operation with the NII-20 Lianozovo electromechanical plant. However, unlike the NNIIRT, this design bureau focused on higher frequency radars like the P-20, P-30, P-30M, P-35, P-32D2 and the P-50 (NATO: E/F-bands). These radars have better accuracy and faster scan rates, and are thus more suited for ground control of fighter aircraft, which complement the lower frequency radars developed by the NNIIRT design bureau. NNIDAR has in recent years expanded their product range to include innovative radar designs like the Podsolnukh-E over-the-horizon (OTH) surface-wave radar and the 29B6 Konteyner. The latter, while also being an OTH-radar, has separate locations for the transmitter and the receiver making it a bi-static system.

VNIIRT 

All-Russian Scientific Research Institute of Radio Engineering (Russian acronym: VNIIRT)
1955; P-15 1RL13 Tropa FLAT FACE A, UHF (B/C-band),
1970; ST-68 (19Zh6) TIN SHIELD, E-band, Fun fact: First Soviet radar with digital coherent signal processing,
1974; P-19 1RL134 Danube FLAT FACE B, UHF (B/C-band)

Summary

See also 
Russian surface-to-air missile design bureaus

References

Military installations of Russia
Military installations of the Soviet Union
Military radars
Radar stations